Vasil (Bulgarian and Macedonian: Васил, Georgian: ვასილ) is a Bulgarian, Macedonian and Georgian masculine given name. It may refer to:

Vasil Adzhalarski, Bulgarian revolutionary, an IMARO leader of revolutionary bands
Vasil Amashukeli (1886–1977), early Georgian film director & cinematographer in Azerbaijan and Georgia
Vasil Angelov (1882–1953), Bulgarian military officer and a revolutionary, a worker of IMARO
Vasil Aprilov (1789–1847), Bulgarian educator
Vasil Barnovi (1856–1934), Georgian writer popular for his historical novels
Vasil Biľak (born 1917), former Slovak Communist leader of Rusyn origin
Vasil Binev (born 1957), Bulgarian actor
Vasil Boev (born 1988), Bulgarian footballer
Vasil Bollano, the ethnic Greek mayor of Himara municipality, in southwest Albania
Vasil Bozhikov (born 1988), Bulgarian football defender
Vasil Bykaŭ (1924–2003), prolific Belarusian author of novels and novellas about World War II
Vasil Chekalarov (1874–1913), Bulgarian revolutionary and one of the leaders of IMARO in Aegean Macedonia
Vasil Chilingrov (born 1951), Bulgarian sprint canoeist who competed in the early to mid-1970s
Vasil Dragolov (born 1962), former Bulgarian footballer
Vasil Etropolski (born 1959), Bulgarian Olympic and world champion sabre fencer
Vasil Garvanliev (born 1984), Macedonian classic and pop singer
Vasil Gendov (1891–1970), Bulgarian actor, film director and screenwriter
Vasil Gigiadze (born 1977), Georgian footballer
Vasil Glavinov (1872–1929), Bulgarian socialist from Ottoman Macedonia, a member of the Bulgarian Workers' Social Democratic Party
Vasil Gruev (born 1926), Bulgarian cross country skier who competed in the 1950s
Vasil Gyuzelev, Bulgarian historian who studies Bulgaria during the Middle Ages
Vasil Iliev, Bulgarian mobster, businessman and wrestler
Vasil Iljoski (1902–1995), Macedonian writer, dramatist, professor
Vasil Kaloyanov (born 1988), Bulgarian footballer
Vasil Kamburov (born 1975), Bulgarian footballer
Vasil Kanchov (1862–1904), Bulgarian geographer, ethnographer and politician
Vasil Khamutowski (born 1978), Belarusian football goalkeeper
Vasil Kirov (born 1975), Bulgarian footballer
Vasil Kiryienka (born 1981), Belarusian racing cyclist for UCI ProTeam Team Sky
Vasil Kochev (born 1988), Bulgarian professional footballer
Vasil Kolarov (1877–1950), Bulgarian communist political leader and leading functionary in the Communist International
Vasil Kutinchev (born 1859), Bulgarian officer
Vasil Laçi (1922–1941), Albanian patriot and monarchist; attempted to kill the King of Italy and Prime Minister of Albania
Vasil Mzhavanadze (1902–1988), the First Secretary of the Communist Party of the Georgian SSR from 1953 to 1972
Vasil Naydenov, Bulgarian singer-songwriter, popular in Bulgaria and the Eastern bloc during the late 1970s and 1980s
Vasil Panayotov (born 1990), Bulgarian football player
Vasil Radoslavov (1854–1929), leading Bulgarian liberal politician who twice served as Prime Minister
Vasil Ringov (born 1955), retired Macedonian football player
Vasil Ruci, retired Albanian football striker
Vasil Shanto (1913–1944), Albanian communist leader and a hero of World War II
Vasil Shkurti (born 1992), Albanian footballer
Vasil Sikharulidze (born 1968), Georgian diplomat and politician
Vasil Slavov (born 1958), Bulgarian author and poet
Vasil Spasov (chess player) (born 1971), Bulgarian chess grandmaster
Vasil Tole (born 1963), Albanian composer of European classical music
Vasil Tsereteli (1862–1937), distinguished Georgian physician, journalist and public benefactor
Vasil Tupurkovski, Macedonian academic, politician and the current president of the Macedonian Olympic Committee
Vasil Varlamos (born 1942), former Australian rules footballer who played for Carlton in the Victorian Football League (VFL) during the early 1960s
Vasil Vasilev (goalkeeper) (born 1976), Bulgarian footballer
Vasil Vasilev (Plovdiv footballer) (born 1984), Bulgarian football defender
Vasil Velev (born 1984), Bulgarian football player
Vasil Yakusha (born 1956), Belarusian former rower who competed for the Soviet Union in the 1980 Summer Olympics and in the 1988 Summer Olympics
Vasil Zacharka (1877–1943), Belarusian statesman and the second president of the Belarusian People's Republic in exile
Vasil Zlatarski, Bulgarian historian-medievalist, archaeologist, and epigraphist

See also
Vasil Levski (disambiguation)
"Vasil Vasiltsiv", song by Esthetic Education devoted to young Ukrainian singer Vasyl Vasyltsiv
Vassil, masculine given name and a surname
 (Serbian Cyrillic: Васиљ), Serbian masculine given name
 (Belarusian: Васіль), Belarusian masculine given name
 (Ukrainian: Василь), Ukrainian masculine given name
Vasiliy (Russian: Василий), Russian masculine given name

Bulgarian masculine given names
Macedonian masculine given names
Georgian masculine given names